Doncaster Education City (or DEC) is a £90 million higher and further education facility in Doncaster, South Yorkshire, England. The centrepiece of the project is a new purpose-built campus in the centre of the city nicknamed The Hub.

DEC was a joint project between Doncaster College, Doncaster Metropolitan Borough Council, the South Yorkshire Learning and Skills Council and Yorkshire Forward .

Existing facilities
Doncaster's higher and further educational needs are currently served by Doncaster College. Doncaster College has two campuses - The Hub and the University Centre, Doncaster.

University Centre
Historically, degree courses have been available at the college, which are accredited by local universities such as the University of Hull. In 2004, Doncaster College designated its High Melton campus as University Centre, with the aim of offering more degree courses, again with support from the University of Hull.

The future
The aim of the project was to have a University College, Doncaster by 2009, and by 2012 have a University of Doncaster.

References

External links
 Doncaster Education City
 Doncaster College
 Yorkshire Forward  - The Regional Development Agency for Yorkshire & Humber

Buildings and structures in Doncaster
Education in Doncaster